Thomas Gardner (28 May 1910 – February 1970) was an English professional association footballer who played as a wing half. He won two caps for the England national football team.

After the end of his playing career he was manager of Oswestry Town in 1949-51.

His great-granddaughter Hannah Keryakoplis played international football for Wales.

References

External links
Tommy Gardner profile at the Aston Villa player database

People from Huyton
English footballers
England international footballers
Association football defenders
Liverpool F.C. players
Grimsby Town F.C. players
Hull City A.F.C. players
Aston Villa F.C. players
Burnley F.C. players
Wrexham A.F.C. players
English Football League players
1910 births
1970 deaths
Oswestry Town F.C. managers
English football managers